A buckwheat pancake is a pancake made with buckwheat flour. Types of buckwheat pancake associated with specific regions include:
 Blini, Eastern Europe, with a buckwheat variety particularly popular in Russia, Ukraine (hrechanyky or гречаники), and Lithuania (grikių blynai)
 Crêpe bretonne, a savory pancake known as bleud ed-du  from Lower Brittany in France
 Kaletez (galette de sarrasin), a buckwheat pancake in Breton cuisine
 Memil-buchimgae, a variety of Korean pancake with buckwheat flour and cabbage
 Ploye, a Canadian pancake, particularly popular in New Brunswick

See also
 List of buckwheat dishes

References

Pancakes
Buckwheat dishes